Chris Dodd (born 1944) was a United States Senator from Connecticut from 1981 to 2011. Senator Dodd may also refer to:

Bill Dodd (California politician) (born 1956), California State Senate
Frank J. Dodd (1938–2010), New Jersey State Senate
Nikiya Harris Dodd (born 1975), Wisconsin State Senate
Thomas J. Dodd (1907–1971), U.S. Senator from Connecticut from 1959 to 1971